Flawless may refer to:

Film
Flawless (1999 film), an American crime comedy film directed by Joel Schumacher
Flawless (2007 film), a British crime film directed by Michael Radford
Flawless (2018 film), an Israeli drama film directed by Tal Granit and Sharon Maymon

Music 
 Flawless, a 2019 album by Dree Low
 "Flawless" (Beyoncé song), 2013
 "Flawless" (The Ones song), 2001
 "Flawless" (Phife Dawg song), 2000
 "Flawless" (V.I.C. song), 2008
 "Flawless (Go to the City)", a song by George Michael, 2004
 "Flawlëss", a song by Yeat, 2022
 "Flawless", a 2014 song by MercyMe from Welcome to the New
 "Flawless", a 2013 song by Studio Killers from Studio Killers
 "Flawless", a 2013 song by The Neighbourhood from I Love You
 "Flawless", a 2017 song from My Little Pony, Friendship Is Magic
 Flawless Records, an American record label

Other uses
Flawless, a Pretty Little Liars novel by Sara Shepard
Flawless (dance troupe), a UK street-dance group

See also
 Flawlessly (1988–2002), an American Thoroughbred race horse